Leucomonia is a genus of moths in the family Sphingidae, containing only one species, Leucomonia bethia, which is known from New South Wales and Queensland.

Adults have grey forewings, each with some dark angular lines and a dark dot near the middle. The hindwings are dark brown.

The larvae have been recorded feeding on Clerodendrum floribundum. Early instars are green with a forward-curving dark brown tail-horn. Later instars develop diagonal white stripes on the side of each segment and the horn curves backward. There is a brown form of later instars for which the diagonal stripes are less conspicuous. Full-grown larvae are about 70 mm long. The caterpillars usually rest by day on the underside of a leaf of their foodplant. Pupation takes place in a brown pupa.

References

Sphingini
Monotypic moth genera
Taxa named by Walter Rothschild
Taxa named by Karl Jordan
Moths of Australia